Elaphurus is a genus of deer. E.davidianus is only extant species and several fossil species are described.

Species
Species are below.

Elaphurus Milne-Edwards, 1872.
Elaphurus davidianus Milne-Edwards, 1866. - Pere David Deer
†Elaphurus bifurcates Teilhard de Chardin et Piveteau, 1930.
†Elaphurus bifurcatus shikamai Otsuka, 1968
†Elaphurus eleonorae Vislobokova, 1988.
†Elaphurus chinnaniensis Chia et Wang, 1978.

References

Cervines
Mammal genera
Taxa named by Henri Milne-Edwards